Vladimir Mihailović (Cyrillic: Владимир Михаиловић; born August 10, 1990) is a Montenegrin professional basketball player for Mornar of the ABA League and the Montenegrin League.

Career
Mihailović started his career in Mornar Bar before moving to Montenegrin basketball giants Budućnost Podgorica in 2010 where he stayed until 2014.

On 11 August 2014, Mihailović signed with Oostende of the Belgian League. On 14 November 2014, he signed with the German club WALTER Tigers Tübingen.

On 3 June 2016, Mihailović signed a one-year deal with s.Oliver Baskets. On 15 December 2016, he left s.Oliver and signed with EWE Baskets Oldenburg for the rest of the season.

On 13 October 2017, Mihailović signed a short-term deal with his former club Oostende. On 27 December 2017, his contract was extended for the rest of the season.

In June 2019, Mihailović signed with Okapi Aalstar. He was named the PBL Most Valuable Player of the 2020–21 season. He averaged a league-leading 19.3 points, 4.2 rebounds and 3.8 assists over 29 games.

In August 2021, Mihailović signed with his former club Mornar Bar.

Montenegrin national team
Mihailović has been a member of Montenegrin national basketball team.

References

External links
Draftexpress.com profile
Eurobasket.com profile
Euroleague.net profile
FIBA.com profile

1990 births
Living people
ABA League players
BC Oostende players
EWE Baskets Oldenburg players
KK Budućnost players
KK Mornar Bar players
KK Włocławek players
Montenegrin expatriate basketball people in Belgium
Montenegrin expatriate basketball people in Germany
Montenegrin expatriate basketball people in Poland
Montenegrin men's basketball players
S.Oliver Würzburg players
Shooting guards
Okapi Aalstar players
Sportspeople from Cetinje
Tigers Tübingen players